The Ancell school of business (ASB) is the business school at Western Connecticut State University.

Nathan S. Ancell, a major benefactor of the university and president of Ethan Allen, was honored with his name in memorial.  The Ancell School of Business is primarily located in the West Side Campus Classroom Building, which also houses the Young Library and the Jane Goodall the Jane Goodall Center for Excellence in Environmental Studies.

Academic departments 
Accounting
Finance
Management
Management Information Systems
Marketing
Division of Justice and Law Administration

Degrees Offered 
Bachelor of Business Administration (BBA)
Bachelor of Science (B.S.)
Master of Business Administration (M.B.A.)
Master of Health Administration (M.H.A.)
Master of Science in Justice Administration (M.S.J.A.)
Paralegal

Areas of Study 

Accounting
Financial Accounting
Managerial Accounting
Finance
Justice and Law Administration
Management
Small Business and Entrepreneurship
Supply Chain Management
Human Resource Management
Supervisory Management
Management Information Systems
Information Security Management
Marketing
E-commerce and Internet Marketing

References 
 Ancell School of Business
 Peterson's Guide

External links 
 Western Connecticut State University
 Apply to Western

Western Connecticut State University
Business schools in Connecticut
Danbury, Connecticut
Universities and colleges in Fairfield County, Connecticut